Trilophidius is a genus of beetles in the family Carabidae, containing the following species:

 Trilophidius alluaudi Jeannel, 1957
 Trilophidius basilewskyi Jeannel, 1957
 Trilophidius bayoni Jeannel, 1957
 Trilophidius carinatus Balkenohl, 2001
 Trilophidius cervilineatus Balkenohl, 2001
 Trilophidius congoanus (Burgeon, 1935)
 Trilophidius decorsei Jeannel, 1957
 Trilophidius devroeyi Jeannel, 1957
 Trilophidius ellenbergeri Jeannel, 1957
 Trilophidius endroedii Balkenohl, 2001
 Trilophidius fastigatus Balkenohl, 2001
 Trilophidius impunctatus (Putzeys, 1868)
 Trilophidius itombwanus Jeannel, 1957
 Trilophidius kahuzicus Jeannel, 1957
 Trilophidius leleupi Jeannel, 1957
 Trilophidius minutulus Balkenohl, 2001
 Trilophidius pallidus (Basilewsky, 1950)
 Trilophidius rudebecki (Basilewsky, 1947)
 Trilophidius ugandanus Basilewsky, 1962

References

Scaritinae